John Amyand (6 November 1751 – 5 June 1780) was an English Whig politician.

He was the second son of Sir George Amyand, a prominent London merchant of huguenot descent. Educated at Eton College, he was elected unopposed as Member of Parliament for Camelford in the general election of 1774. He died in office on 5 June 1780.

References

1751 births
1780 deaths
British MPs 1774–1780
Members of the Parliament of Great Britain for English constituencies
People educated at Eton College
Younger sons of baronets